The Howard O'Neal Barn was a historic barn near Russell, Arkansas.  It was located southeast of the city off Roetzel Road.  It was a two-story wood-frame structure, with a gambrel roof.  In layout it has a transverse crib plan, and was designed to house equipment, farm animals, and feed.  Built about 1938, it was a good example of a period barn in White County.

The barn was listed on the National Register of Historic Places in 1992.  It has been listed as destroyed in the Arkansas Historic Preservation Program database.

See also
National Register of Historic Places listings in White County, Arkansas

References

Barns on the National Register of Historic Places in Arkansas
Demolished buildings and structures in Arkansas
National Register of Historic Places in White County, Arkansas
1938 establishments in Arkansas
Buildings and structures completed in 1938